Typhoon Koppu, known in the Philippines as Typhoon Lando, was a powerful and devastating tropical cyclone that struck Luzon in October 2015. It was the twenty-fourth named storm and the fifteenth typhoon of the annual typhoon season. Similar to Goni earlier in the year, Koppu originated from a tropical disturbance east of the Mariana Islands on October 10. Moving briskly west, the system consolidated into a tropical depression the following day and further into a tropical storm on October 13. Situated over the warm waters of the Philippine Sea, Koppu quickly deepened. The storm reached its peak intensity on October 17 with ten-minute sustained winds of  according to the Japan Meteorological Agency (JMA). The storm subsequently made landfall at this strength near Casiguran, Philippines. Rapid weakening ensued due to interaction with the mountainous terrain of Luzon and the disheveled core of Koppu emerged over the South China Sea on October 19. Unfavorable environmental conditions inhibited reorganization and the system diminished to a tropical depression on October 21.

Prior to Koppu's landfall, PAGASA raised Public Storm Warning Signals for numerous provinces; nearly 24,000 people evacuated accordingly. The storm caused tremendous structural damage in coastal provinces, with thousands of structures damaged or destroyed. Preliminary damage totals amount to ₱14.4 billion (US$313 million).

Meteorological history

A tropical disturbance formed in a monsoon trough late on October 10, over Enewetak Atoll. One day later, the Japan Meteorological Agency (JMA) upgraded the low-pressure area to a tropical depression, yet the low-level circulation center was exposed owing to strong vertical wind shear. On October 12, as the system kept consolidating with convection sheared to the west, the Joint Typhoon Warning Center (JTWC) issued a Tropical Cyclone Formation Alert; half a day after, the JMA started to issue tropical cyclone warnings about the tropical depression. The JTWC upgraded the system to a tropical depression early on October 13, although fragmented convective bands were wrapping tighter into a broad LLCC which remained exposed. At noon, tracking westward along the southern periphery of the deep-layered subtropical ridge, the system intensified into a tropical storm and was named Koppu by the JMA.

Early on October 14, the storm entered the Philippine Area of Responsibility and received the name Lando from PAGASA, and deepened convection finally obscured the LLCC late on the same day, shortly before being upgraded to a severe tropical storm by the JMA. Under a favorable environment of low vertical wind shear and radial outflow, Koppu deepened rapidly and intensified into a typhoon in the afternoon of October 15, when a tightly curved convective band was wrapping into an eye revealed by a microwave imagery.

Frictional effects from land interaction with Luzon started to erode the typhoon rapidly after landfall, despite excellent dual outflow channels. Before noon or in the afternoon on October 18, Koppu emerged into the South China Sea as a disorganized system which had begun to encounter with stronger easterly vertical wind shear. Tracking northward very slowly along the western periphery of an extension of the deep-layered subtropical ridge to the east-northeast, the proximity to Luzon was inhibiting the system from consolidating, leading the JMA to downgrade Koppu to a severe tropical storm when main convection had been sheared to the west early on October 19. Both the JTWC and then the JMA downgraded the highly unorganized system with a ragged LLCC to a tropical storm in the afternoon. Continuing hugging the coast of Luzon on October 20, Koppu drifted northeastward and then east-northeastward due to embedded within a weak complex steering environment with a near-equatorial ridge to the south and an induced ridge between Typhoon Champi and Koppu; convective organization was also hampered by being embedded in a mid-level trough along the western periphery of the subtropical ridge.

Preparations and impact

The advised areas were initially concentrated around east-central Luzon. As the typhoon intensified, the PSWS levels were raised and expanded. Following the storm's landfall, PSWS were gradually lowered over the subsequent several days. Nearly 24,000 people evacuated ahead of the typhoon's arrival while numerous schools, businesses, and government offices closed. A total of 88 flights were canceled.

Powerful winds caused widespread damage and disruption across Luzon. Nine provinces suffered total power outages and throughout the affected regions of Luzon, approximately 9 million people—roughly 10 percent of the entire nation—lost electricity. Aurora Province sustained a direct hit from the typhoon. Nearly every structure in Casiguran was damaged or destroyed. The nearby towns of Dinalungan and Dilasag were rendered inaccessible. Torrential rains fell across much of region, with western coastal areas seeing the highest accumulations. If verified, these would be the greatest 12- and 24-hour rainfall totals on record in the Philippines. The heaviest rains were fairly concentrated, with Quezon City in Metro Manila to the south recording only . Along the northwestern coast, Vigan saw  accumulate.

Approximately 1.24 million people were directly affected by the storm; at one point, 113,584 people moved to evacuation centers. Throughout the affected regions, 17,254 homes were damaged and 1,504 were destroyed. 62 people were killed, and total damage reached ₱14.4 billion (US$313 million).

In the central Philippines, two motorboats capsized in separate incidents resulting in a collective ten fatalities. Virac and Daet saw  of rain, respectively, as Koppu passed to the north.

Highest Public Storm Warning Signal

Aftermath 

The Philippines' National Disaster Risk Reduction and Management Council (NDRRMC) has provided ₱122.8 million (US$2.67 million) worth of assistance. On October 18, Australia was the first foreign government to offer support to typhoon relief.  On 22 October Australian Foreign Minister Julie Bishop announced A$1 million (US$726,000) in support to families affected by the typhoon.

A state of calamity was declared for the provinces of Aurora, Cagayan, Isabela, Nueva Ecija, Nueva Vizcaya, Tarlac, Pangasinan, Quirino, three cities namely Dagupan, Ilagan and Tuguegarao, and to nine towns specifically Arayat, Baler, Cabatuan, Calumpit, Camiling, General Nakar, Infanta, Ramos and Sugpon owing to widespread flooding.

Retirement

Due to the typhoon's destructive effects in the Philippines, the name Koppu was retired at the Fourth Joint Session of the ESCAP/WMO Typhoon Committee and WMO/ESCAP Panel on Tropical Cyclones during 2016. In February 2017, they chose the name Koguma to replace Koppu. The name Koguma was first used in the 2021 Pacific typhoon season. PAGASA also announced that Lando will be removed from their naming lists and will never be used again. Its replacement name will be Liwayway which was first used in the 2019 Pacific typhoon season.

See also

Tropical cyclones in 2015
Typhoon Nancy (1982)
Typhoon Nanmadol (2004)
Typhoon Nari (2013)
Typhoon Hagupit (2014)
Typhoon Vamco (2020)

References

External links

JMA General Information of Typhoon Koppu (1524) from Digital Typhoon
JMA Best Track Data of Typhoon Koppu (1524) 

24W.KOPPU from the U.S. Naval Research Laboratory

Koppu
Koppu
Koppu
2015 disasters in the Philippines
Koppu